The 26th Annual Bengal Film Journalists' Association Awards were held on 1963, honoring the best in Indian cinema in 1962.

Main Awards

Best Indian Films (In Order of Merit) 
 Abhijan
 Kanchenjungha
 Kancher Swarga
 Dada Thakur
 Sahib Bibi Aur Ghulam
 Bhagini Nivedita
 Sautela Bhai
 Hansuli Banker Upakatha
 Aarti
 Banarasi

Best Director 
Satyajit Ray - Abhijan

Best Actor 
Soumitra Chatterjee - Abhijan

Best Actress 
Arundhati Mukherjee - Bhagini Nivedita

Best Actor In Supporting Role 
Charu Prakash Ghosh - Abhijan

Best Actress in Supporting Role 
Anubha Gupta - Hansuli Banker Upakatha

Best Cinematographer 
Dilip Ranjan Mukherjee - Kumari Mon

Best Music Director 
Robin Chatterjee - Mayar Sansar

Best Lyricist 
Tarashankar Banerjee - Hansuli Banker Upakatha

Best Audiographer 
Satyen Chatterjee - Dada Thakur

Best Dialogue 
Satyajit Ray - Kanchenjungha

Hindi Section

Best Director 
Abrar Alvi - Sahib Bibi Aur Ghulam

Best Actor 
Guru Dutt - Sahib Bibi Aur Ghulam

Best Actress 
Meena Kumari - Aarti

Best Actor in Supporting Role
Rehman - Sahib Bibi Aur Ghulam

Best Actress in Supporting Role 
Shashikala - Aarti

Best Music Director 
Hemant Kumar - Bees Saal Baad

Best Lyricist 
Hasrat Jaipuri and Shailendra - Professor

Best Cinematographer 
V. R. Murthy - Sahib Bibi Aur Ghulam

Best Audiographer 
R. G. Pushalkar - Aarti

Best Dialogue 
Abrar Alvi - Sahib Bibi Aur Ghulam

Foreign Film Section

Ten Best Films 
 Two Women
 The Island
 Ballad of a Soldier
 Come September
 The Guns of Navarone
 The Longest Day
 Spartacus
 La Dolce Vita
 Sleeping Beauty
 Psycho

Best Director 
Kaneto Shindo - The Island

Best Actor 
Gregory Peck - The Guns of Navarone

Best Actress 
Sophia Loren - Two Women

Best Supporting Actor 
Charles Laughton - Spartacus

Best Supporting Actress 
Sandra Dee - Come September

See also 
 25th Annual BFJA Awards
 27th Annual BFJA Awards

References 

Bengal Film Journalists' Association Awards